Vladimir Grigorievich Dobrikov (August 30, 1925 –  March 1995) was a Soviet football player and coach. Master Sports of the USSR. Honored coach of the RSFSR.

Biography 
In 1947 he played for ODO Kiev. Then a few years spent in the team FC MVO Moscow, he became a finalist in its composition the USSR Cup 1951 held in the hand all the matches of his team and scored one goal in the gates league teams FC Dynamo Moscow and Shakhtar Stalino. In the same season his team won the class B (at that time  the second strongest division of the Soviet football). Perhaps Dobrikov also participated in a victory for the club championship of the RSFSR in 1950. In the season 1952 played for the MVO Class A only 3 matches. Then he spent two seasons in   Zenit (31 and 2 goals a game in Class A, 5 games and 3 goals in the USSR Cup).

He graduated from the High School coaches. In 1963 and 1970 he worked as a senior manager in FC Zirka Kropyvnytskyi. Coached FC Lokomotiv Kaluga, which he became the champion of the RSFSR in 1966 year.

In the season of 1971 he worked in the second division with FC Spartak Kostroma. He also worked in the Leningrad football school youth, young men trained in Moscow. He died in March 1995.

References

External links
 Профиль на footbook.ru 
 Профиль на zenit-history.ru

1925 births
1995 deaths
FC Rubin Kazan managers
Soviet football managers
Soviet footballers
Russian football managers
FC CSKA Kyiv players
FC Zenit Saint Petersburg players
FC Arsenal Tula managers
FC Zirka Kropyvnytskyi managers
Association footballers not categorized by position